Dialeucias pallidistriata is a moth of the family Erebidae first described by George Hampson in 1901. It is found in Brazil, Suriname, Ecuador, Peru and Venezuela.

References

Phaegopterina
Moths described in 1901